Saint-Hilaire-de-Court is a commune in the Cher department in the Centre-Val de Loire region of France.

Geography
The A20 autoroute passes through the commune’s territory.

Population

Sights
 The chapel, dating from the fifteenth century.
 The chateau of La Beuvrière, dating from the sixteenth century.

See also
Communes of the Cher department

References

Communes of Cher (department)